Zheleznogorsk-Ilimsky is a town and the administrative center of Nizhneilimsky District of Irkutsk Oblast, Russia, located  north of Irkutsk, the administrative center of the oblast. Population:

Geography
The town is located in the Lena-Angara Plateau.

History
It was founded in 1948, in connection with the beginning of exploitation of the iron deposits at Zheleznaya Gora (Iron Mountain). It was initially named Korshunikha, after prospector Shestak Korshunov who had discovered the Iron Mountain in the 17th century.

It was granted urban-type settlement status in the 1950s, after a period of growth following the construction of the western section of the Baikal–Amur Mainline, and renamed Zheleznogorsk (Iron Mountain Town). With the completion of a major ore processing plant, town status was granted in 1965 under the present name, the suffix "Ilimsky" added to differentiate from other towns of the same name.

Administrative and municipal status
Within the framework of administrative divisions, Zheleznogorsk-Ilimsky serves as the administrative center of Nizhneilimsky District, to which it is directly subordinated. As a municipal division, the town of Zheleznogorsk-Ilimsky is incorporated within Nizhneilimsky Municipal District as Zheleznogorskoye Urban Settlement.

Economy
The town's economy is mainly reliant on the open pit iron ore mine and ore processing works, owned by the company Mechel Inc.

Transportation
The town has a station called Korshunikha-Angarskaya on the Baikal–Amur Mainline, it is also on the road from Bratsk to Ust-Kut.

Sister city
 Sakata, Japan

References

Notes

Sources

External links

Official website of Zheleznogorsk-Ilimsky 
City Business Directory 

Cities and towns in Irkutsk Oblast